Gaspar de Lemos (15th century) was a Portuguese explorer and captain of the supply ship of Pedro Álvares Cabral's fleet that arrived to Brazil. Gaspar de Lemos was sent back to Portugal with news of their discovery and was credited by the Viscount of Santarém as having discovered the Fernando de Noronha archipelago in the Atlantic Ocean.

Personal life 

Very little is known about the life of Gaspar de Lemos.  It is postulated that he was a part of the Morgada family, originally from the Kingdom of Galiza, but came to Portugal during the reign of Afonso IV (1325–1357).  Upon his arrival back to Europe after participation in the exploration of the new world, the name Gaspar de Lemos disappears from the historical record, only to reappear later between 1536 and 1537 in India, under the service of Martim Afonso de Sousa.  No further information has been discovered.

Discoveries and Expeditions 

Gaspar de Lemos was the commander of a supply ship from Pedro Álvares Cabral's fleet. Cabral chose him to return to Portugal after the sighting of the new world to let King Manuel I know of its existence. Lemos returned to Portugal bringing Pedro Vaz de Caminha's letter announcing the "discovery" of Brazil.

This expedition is credited with:
  
 The discovery of the archipelago of Fernando de Noronha
 The discovery of the bay that he named Bay of All Saints on November 1, 1501
 The discovery of the Bay of Guanabara, which he mistook as a river and named Rio de Janeiro on January 1, 1502
 The discovery of the island of São Vicente, on January 22, 1502.

Discovery of Brazil
The Florentine Amerigo Vespucci, with his four sailing ships that sailed from Cadiz on May 18, 1499, made a stopover in the Canaries, and in twenty-four days of crossing they reached the shores of the present Guiana.  Here they divided: two, with Hojeda and the pilot Juan de la Cosa, headed north to recognize the coasts already sighted by Columbus; two, under the command of Vespucci, turned at noon, in search of the legendary Capo Cattigare, the promontory placed by Ptolemy at 9° of southern latitude, to try to reach, beyond that, the Sinus Magnus.  On this trip Vespucci discovered, six months before Vincenzo Yáñez Pinzón, the river of the Amazons, that he went up for tens of miles and, after having cut for first the Equator to the west, he went beyond the 6° of south latitude. So it was officially Amerigo Vespucci who discovered Brazil a few months before Pedro Álvares Cabral.

See also
Exploration of Asia

References

15th-century explorers
Portuguese explorers of South America
Maritime history of Portugal
15th-century Portuguese people